This is a list of episodes of the anime series Legendz.

Episode listing

Legendz